The Czech National Badminton Championships is a tournament organized to crown the best badminton players in the Czech Republic.

The tournament started in 1993 and is held every year.

Past winners

References
Details of affiliated national organisations at Badminton Europe

National badminton championships
Badminton tournaments in the Czech Republic
Recurring sporting events established in 1993
1993 establishments in the Czech Republic
Badminton